The 2000–01 Belgian Hockey League season was the 81st season of the Belgian Hockey League, the top level of ice hockey in Belgium. Six teams participated in the league, and Phantoms Deurne won the championship.

Regular season

Final round

Final 
 HYC Herentals - Phantoms Deurne 0:2 (4:10, 3:9)

4th-6th place

References
Season on hockeyarchives.info

Belgian Hockey League
Belgian Hockey League seasons
Bel